Stanislovas Kęsgaila Jonaitis (died 1527) was a  Lithuanian nobleman, son of Jonas Kęsgaila from the Kęsgailos family. Stanislovas Kęsgaila was the Elder of Samogitia (1486–1522), Grand Hetman of Lithuania (1501–1502), castellan of Trakai (1499–1522) and Vilnius (1522–1526). 

In 1494, he signed a peace agreement with the Grand Duchy of Moscow. The treaty was reinforced with engagement of Grand Duke of Lithuania Alexander Jagiellon and Helena, daughter of Ivan III. As the groom was away in Lithuania, his role was performed by Kęsgaila. 

At the start of the Russo-Lithuanian war of 1500–1503, Lithuanians suffered a major defeat in the Battle of Vedrosha. Great Hetman (army commander) Konstanty Ostrogski was captured and was replaced by Semyon Olshanski who had gained military experience during the Polish–Ottoman War (1485–1503). But Olshanski was quickly replaced by Kęsgaila who had no prior military experience. Such appointment is difficult to explain, but possibly it was a result of diplomatic negotiations that ended in a military alliance with the Livonian Order. Kęsgaila brought Lithuanian army to help the besieged Mstislavl and Smolensk, but in both cases the Russians retreated without a fight. He was replaced as Great Hetman by Stanisław Kiszka who distinguished himself in organizing Smolensk's defense.

In 1505, he was expelled from the Lithuanian Council of Lords by Alexander Jagiellon for participation in the Union of Mielnik of 1501. In 1516, during a border conflict, Kęsgaila commanded Samogitian forces, defeated the Teutonic Order, and captured Katyčiai. However, Albert, Duke of Prussia, recaptured the village a few months later.

Family
His main patrimonial property was in Kražiai. He fathered three sons Mykolas, Jonas, and Stanislovas Kęsgaila and at least one daughter Barbara who married Jan Janowicz Zabrzeziński. Kęsgaila died in 1527 and was buried at Vilnius Cathedral.

References

1527 deaths
Year of birth unknown
Stanislovas
Great Hetmans of the Grand Duchy of Lithuania
Burials at Vilnius Cathedral
Elders of Samogitia